Passing Stranger is the debut album of British singer-songwriter, Scott Matthews, and was originally released in March 2006, before being re-issued by Island Records in October of the same year. The album contains the singles "Elusive", "Dream Song" and "Passing Stranger". After Scott won the Ivor Novello Award for 'Best Song Lyrically and Musically' for "Elusive", a deluxe edition of the album was re-released, and was made available on 25 June 2007.

The album features ten full-length songs and seven short instrumental or minimal pieces.

Track listing
All songs written by Scott Matthews.
"Little Man Tabla Jam Pt.1" – 0:40
"Dream Song" – 4:42
"The Fool's Fooling Himself" – 4:01
"Eyes Wider Than Before" – 3:36
"Blue In The Face Again" – 1:11
"Sweet Scented Figure" – 4:31
"Passing Stranger" – 4:32
"Prayers" – 3:15
"Musical Interval" – 1:11
"Still Fooling" – 0:21
"City Headache" – 4:59
"Nylon Instrumental" – 0:19
"Elusive" – 3:42
"Earth To Calm" – 4:17
"White Feathered Medicine" – 5:45
"Little Man Tabla Jam Pt. 2" – 0:34
"Bruno Finale" – 2:19

A deluxe two-disc edition was released in 2007 containing new recordings (on disc 2), produced by John Leckie and featuring a string quartet:

 "Dream Song" – 4:37
 "Eyes Wider Than Before" – 4:00
 "Elusive" – 3:43
 "City Headache" – 4:47
 "The Fool's Fooling Himself" – 3:59

Personnel
Scott Matthews – vocals, guitars, bass guitar, percussion, harmonica
Jon Cotton – Rhodes, piano, Wurlitzer, vibraphone, sound engineer, record producer
Matt Thomas – drums, percussion
Sukhvinder Singh Namdhari – tabla
Mat Taylor – saxophone, flute, clarinet
Richard Adey – accordion
Caroline Bodimead – violin
Charlote Miles – violin
Nina Kopparhead – viola
Elizabeth Garside – cello
Bruno Cavellec – voice-over

References

External links
Full tracklisting for Passing Stranger (Deluxe Edition recorded with John Leckie)
Ivor Novello Reception and Album Re-Release Details

2006 debut albums
Scott Matthews albums
Island Records albums